The inaugural Hungarian Chess Championship was held in the city of Győr in 1906. Initially, there was no governing body responsible for its organisation, until the formation of the Hungarian Chess Federation. The HCF first appeared in 1911, but failed to establish itself properly until 1923.

The regularity of the Championship was patchy prior to 1950, due in part to the two world wars and inadequate funding. Since 1949 however, the HCF has been integrated with the Hungarian Sports Federation and so receives state support. Consequently, the Championship has since been held on an annual basis, with only the occasional omission. Exceptionally two consecutive events have occurred in the same year, due to the event being held at the year end.

The events held in 1981, 1984, 1991 and 1997 were all termed Super Championships. In both 1985 and 1988, the traditional national championship was substituted by an open championship and the winner of both editions was the Hungarian IM Béla Perényi.

The venue for the event has mostly been the Hungarian capital city, Budapest. The events held post-World War II carry the official numbering (#) shown below, while the events held prior to 1945 are tagged with the letter 'p' (#p).

The 1999 championship (49th Men's, 47th Women's) was held 1–9 February in Lillafüred.
In the men's section, the ten-player single round-robin tournament (average Elo rating 2553) was won by GM Zoltán Almási 6.0/9, a half point ahead of GM Gyula Sax and GM Zoltán Varga.  The ten-player women's single round-robin (average Elo 2261) was won by WM Nóra Medvegy on tie-break over IM Ildikó Mádl, both with 6.0/9.
Although invited by the Hungarian Chess Federation, some of the strongest Hungarian players chose not to participate in this event, including Susan Polgar, Judit Polgár, Zsófia Polgár, Péter Lékó, Lajos Portisch, and Zoltán Ribli.

Men's winners
{| class="sortable wikitable"
! # !! Year !! City !! Winner
|-
| 01p  || 1906 || Győr || Zoltán von Balla
|-
| 02p  || 1907 || Székesfehérvár || Leó Forgács
|-
| 03p  || 1911 || Budapest || Zoltán von Balla, Zsigmond Barász
|-
| 04p  || 1912 || Temesvár || Gyula Breyer
|-
| 05p  || 1913 || Debrecen || Lajos Asztalos
|-
| 06p  || 1922 || Budapest || Kornél Havasi
|-
| 07p  || 1924 || Győr || Géza Nagy
|-
| 08p  || 1928 || Budapest || Árpád Vajda
|-
| 09p  || 1931 || Budapest || Lajos Steiner
|-
| 10p  || 1932 || Budapest || Géza Maróczy
|-
| 11p  || 1933 || Budapest || Esteban Canal
|-
| 12p  || 1934 || Budapest || Erich Eliskases
|-
| 13p  || 1935 || Tatatóváros || László Szabó
|-
| 14p  || 1936 || Budapest || Lajos Steiner, Miguel Najdorf
|-
| 15p  || 1937 || Budapest || László Szabó
|-
| 16p  || 1939 || Budapest || László Szabó
|-
| 17p  || 1941 || Budapest || Géza Füster
|-
| 18p  || 1942 || Budapest || Gedeon Barcza
|-
| 19p  || 1943 || Diósgyőr || Gedeon Barcza
|-
| 01  || 1945 || Budapest || Tibor Florián
|-
| 02  || 1946 || Budapest || László Szabó
|-
| 03  || 1947 || Budapest || Gedeon Barcza
|-
| 04  || 1948 || Budapest || Pal Benko
|-
| 05   || 1950(1) || Budapest || Gedeon Barcza
|-
| 06   || 1950(2) || Budapest || László Szabó
|-
| 07   || 1951 || Budapest || Gedeon Barcza
|-
| 08   || 1952 || Budapest || László Szabó
|-
| 09   || 1953 || Budapest || Béla Sándor
|-
| 10   || 1954 || Budapest || László Szabó
|-
| 11   || 1955 || Budapest || Gedeon Barcza
|-
| 12   || 1957 ||  Budapest || Gedeon Barcza  
|-
| 13   || 1958(1) || Budapest || Lajos Portisch
|-
| 14   || 1958(2) || Budapest || Lajos Portisch
|-
| 15   || 1959 || Budapest || László Szabó
|-
| 16   || 1961 || Budapest || Lajos Portisch
|-
| 17   || 1962 || Budapest || Lajos Portisch
|-
| 18   || 1963 || Budapest || István Bilek
|-
| 19   || 1964 || Budapest || Lajos Portisch
|-
| 20   || 1965(1) || Budapest || István Bilek
|-
| 21   || 1965(2) || Budapest || Lajos Portisch
|-
| 22   || 1966 || Budapest || Gedeon Barcza
|-
| 23   || 1967/8 || Budapest || László Szabó
|-
| 24   || 1968/9 || Budapest || Győző Forintos
|-
| 25   || 1969 || Budapest || Péter Dely
|-
| 26   || 1970 || Budapest || István Bilek
|-
| 27   || 1971 || Budapest || Lajos Portisch
|-
| 28   || 1972 || Budapest || István Csom
|-
| 29   || 1973 || Budapest || Zoltán Ribli
|-
| 30   || 1974 || Budapest || Zoltán Ribli
|-
| 31   || 1975 || Budapest || Lajos Portisch
|-
| 32   || 1976 || Budapest || Gyula Sax
|-
| 33   || 1977 || Budapest || Gyula Sax, Zoltán Ribli
|-
| 34   || 1978 || Budapest || József Pintér
|-
| 35   || 1979 || Budapest || József Pintér
|-
| 36   || 1980 || Budapest || Péter Lukács
|-
| 37   || 1981 || Budapest || Lajos Portisch
|-
| 38   || 1982 || Budapest || Attila Schneider
|-
| 39   || 1984 || Budapest || András Adorján
|-
| 40   || 1986 || Budapest || Iván Faragó
|-
| 41   || 1989 || Budapest || Attila Schneider
|-
| 42   || 1991 || Budapest || Judit Polgár
|-
| 43   || 1992 || Budapest  || András Adorján
|-
| 44   || 1993 || Gyula || András Adorján
|-
| 45   || 1994|| Budapest ||  Csaba Horváth 
|-
| 46   || 1995 || Budapest || Zoltán Almási
|-
| 47   || 1996 || Budapest || Zoltán Varga
|-
| 48   || 1997 || Budapest || Zoltán Almási
|-
| 49   || 1998 || Budapest  || Csaba Horváth 
|-
| 50   || 1999 || Lillafüred || Zoltán Almási
|-
| 51   || 2000 || Budapest || Zoltán Almási
|-
| 52   || 2002 || Balatonlelle || Róbert Ruck
|-
| 53   || 2003 || Hévíz || Zoltán Almási
|-
| 54   || 2004 || Budapest || Ferenc Berkes
|-
| 55   || 2005 || Kazincbarcika || Zoltán Gyimesi
|-
| 56   || 2006 || Székesfehérvár || Zoltán Almási
|-
| 57   || 2007 || Budapest || Ferenc Berkes
|-
| 58   || 2008 || Nyíregyháza || Zoltán Almási
|-
| 59   || 2009 || Szeged || Zoltán Almási
|-
| 60   || 2010 || Szeged || Ferenc Berkes
|-
| 61   || 2011 || Hévíz || Viktor Erdős
|-
| 62   || 2012 || Hévíz || Ferenc Berkes
|-
| 63   || 2013 || Gyula || Ferenc Berkes
|-
| 64   || 2014 || Zalakaros || Ferenc Berkes
|-
| 65   || 2015 || Zalakaros || Ádám Horváth
|-
| 66   || 2016 || Zalakaros || Ferenc Berkes
|-
|67    || 2017 || Zalakaros || Richárd Rapport
|-
| 68 || 2018 || Budapest || Ferenc Berkes
|-
| 69 || 2019 || Budapest || Zoltán Almási
|}

Women's winners
{| class="sortable wikitable"
! # !! Year !! City !! Winner
|-
| p1 || 1942 || Budapest || Józsa Lángos
|-
| p2 || 1943 || Budapest || Józsa Lángos
|-
| p3 || 1944 || Budapest || Józsa Lángos
|-
| 1 || 1947 || Tatabánya || Józsa Lángos
|-
| || 1949 || Tatabánya || Józsa Lángos
|-
| 2 || 1950 || Tatabánya || Józsa Lángos
|-
| 3 || 1951 || Budapest || Józsa Lángos
|-
| 4 || 1952 || Budapest || Józsa Lángos
|-
| 5 || 1953 || Budapest || Jolán Krcsmarik
|-
| 6 || 1954 || Budapest || Éva Karakas
|-
| 7 || 1955 || Budapest || Erzsébet Finta
|-
| 8 || 1956 || Budapest || Éva Karakas
|-
| 9 || 1957 || Budapest || Irén Hönsch
|-
| 10 || 1958 || Budapest || Istvánné Bilek
|-
| 11 || 1959 || Budapest || Jenőné Sillye
|-
| 12 || 1960 || Budapest || Jenőné Sillye
|-
| 13 || 1961 || Budapest || Károlyné Honfi
|-
| 14 || 1962 || Budapest || Éva Karakas
|-
| 15 || 1963 || Budapest || Istvánné Bilek
|-
| 16 || 1964 || Budapest || Erzsébet Finta
|-
| 17 || 1965 || Budapest || Éva Karakas
|-
| 18 || 1966 || Budapest || Éva Karakas
|-
| 19 || 1967 || Budapest || Mária Ivánka
|-
| 20 || 1968 || Budapest || Mária Ivánka
|-
| 21 || 1970(1) || Budapest || Mária Ivánka
|-
| 22 || 1970(2) || Budapest || Mária Ivánka
|-
| 23 || 1971 || Budapest || Mária Ivánka
|-
| 24 || 1972 || Budapest || Mária Ivánka
|-
| 25 || 1973 || Budapest || Zsuzsa Verőci
|-
| 26 || 1974 || Budapest || Mária Ivánka
|-
| 27 || 1975 || Budapest || Éva Karakas
|-
| 28 || 1976 || Budapest || Éva Karakas
|-
| 29 || 1977 || Budapest || Zsuzsa Verőci
|-
| 30 || 1978 || Budapest || Mária Ivánka
|-
| 31 || 1979 || Budapest || Mária Porubszky
|-
| 32 || 1980 || Budapest || Zsuzsa Makai
|-
| 33 || 1981 || Budapest || Tünde Csonkics
|-
| 34 || 1982 || Budapest || Ilona Kurucsai
|-
| 35 || 1983 || Budapest || Zsuzsa Verőci
|-
| 36 || 1985 || Budapest || Ildikó Mádl
|-
| 37 || 1986 || Budapest || Mária Ivánka
|-
| 38 || 1988 || Budapest || Erika Sziva
|-
| 39 || 1990 || Győr || Ildikó Mádl
|-
| 40 || 1991 || Budapest || Ildikó Mádl
|-
| 41 || 1992 || Budapest || Rita Atkins
|-
| 42 || 1993 || Gyula || Ildikó Mádl
|-
| 43 || 1995(1) || Budapest || Eva Forgo
|-
| 44 || 1995(2) || Budapest || Nóra Medvegy
|-
| 45 || 1996 || Hévíz || Mónika Grábics
|-
| 46 || 1997 || Budapest || Nikoletta Lakos
|-
| 47 || 1999 || Lillafüred || Nóra Medvegy
|-
| 48 || 2000 || Budapest || Anita Gara
|-
| 49 || 2001 || Budapest || Anita Gara
|-
| 50 || 2002 || Budapest || Nikoletta Lakos
|-
| 53 || 2003 || Budapest || Yelena Dembo
|-
| 54 || 2004 || Budapest || Szidonia Vajda
|-
| 55 || 2005 || Szeged || Nikoletta Lakos
|-
| 56 || 2006 || Szeged || Ticia Gara
|-
| 57 || 2007 || Budapest || Ticia Gara
|-
| 58 || 2008 || Visegrád || Anna Rudolf
|-
| 59 || 2009 || Eger || Anita Gara
|-
| 60 || 2010 || Nyíregyháza || Anna Rudolf
|-
| 61 || 2011 || Szeged || Anna Rudolf
|-
| 62 || 2012 || Kisvárda || Petra Papp
|-
| 63 || 2013 || Hévíz || Anita Gara 
|-
| 64 || 2014 || Zalakaros || Ildikó Mádl
|-
| 65 || 2015 || Budapest || Szidonia Vajda
|-
| 66 || 2016 || Mándok || Anita Gara
|-
| 67 || 2017 || Zalakaros || Anita Gara
|-
| 68 || 2018 || Budapest || Bianka Havanecz
|-
| 69 || 2019 || Budapest || Ticia Gara
|}

Crosstables

{| class="wikitable" style="text-align: center;"
|+ HUN-ch 42nd Budapest 1991
!   !! Player !! Rating !! 1 !! 2 !! 3 !! 4 !! 5 !! 6 !! 7 !! 8 !! 9 !! 0 !! Points !! TB !! Perf. !! +/- 
|-
| 1 || align=left|      ||2550  ||* ||½ ||1 ||½ ||½ ||½ ||½ ||1 ||1 ||½ ||6  || || 2648 || +12
|-
| 2 || align=left|    ||2530  ||½ ||* ||½ ||½ ||1 ||½ ||½ ||½ ||½ ||1 ||5½  ||23.75 || 2608 || +10
|-
| 3 || align=left|         ||2600  ||0 ||½ ||* ||½ ||1 ||1 ||½ ||½ ||1 ||½ ||5½ ||23.25 || 2600 || 0
|-
| 4 || align=left|    ||2540  ||½ ||½ ||½ ||* ||½ ||½ ||½ ||1 ||½ ||½ ||5 ||21.75 || 2567 || +4
|-
| 5 || align=left|         ||2535  ||½ ||0 ||0 ||½ ||* ||1 ||1 ||1 ||½ ||½ ||5  ||20.25 || 2568 || +4
|-
| 6 || align=left|    ||2570  ||½ ||½ ||0 ||½ ||0 ||* ||1 ||½ ||1 ||½ ||4½  || || 2526 || -6
|-
| 7 || align=left|      ||2500  ||½ ||½ ||½ ||½ ||0 ||0 ||* ||½ ||½ ||½ ||3½  ||16.00 || 2455 || -6
|-
| 8 || align=left|      ||2480  ||0 ||½ ||½ ||0 ||0 ||½ ||½ ||* ||½ ||1 ||3½  ||14.25 || 2458 || -3
|-
| 9 || align=left| ||2480  ||0 ||½ ||0 ||½ ||½ ||0 ||½ ||½ ||* ||1 ||3½  ||14.25 || 2458 || -3
|-
| 10 || align=left|      ||2515  ||½ ||0 ||½ ||½ ||½ ||½ ||½ ||0 ||0 ||* ||3  || || 2412 || -13
|}

{| class="wikitable" style="text-align: center;"
|+ HUN-ch (Women) 51st Budapest 2001
!   !! Player !! Rating !! 1 !! 2 !! 3 !! 4 !! 5 !! 6 !! 7 !! 8 !! 9 !! 0 !! Points !! TB !! Perf. !! +/- 
|-
| 1 || align=left|      ||2303  ||* ||½ ||½ ||½ ||1 ||1 ||½ ||1 ||1 ||1 ||7  || || 2487 || +21
|-
| 2 || align=left|   ||2158  ||½ ||* ||1 ||0 ||½ ||1 ||0 ||1 ||1 ||1 ||5  ||22.00 || 2324 || +20
|-
| 3 || align=left|     ||2391  ||½ ||0 ||* ||0 ||1 ||½ ||1 ||1 ||1 ||1 ||5 ||20.75 || 2299 || -11
|-
| 4 || align=left|  ||2295  ||½ ||1 ||1 ||* ||0 ||0 ||½ ||1 ||1 ||½ ||5 ||20.25 || 2309 || +2
|-
| 5 || align=left|   ||2294  ||½ ||½ ||0 ||1 ||* ||½ ||0 ||½ ||1 ||1 ||5  ||20.25 || 2309 || +2
|-
| 6 || align=left|       ||2184  ||0 ||0 ||½ ||½ ||½ ||* ||1 ||½ ||½ ||½ ||5  ||19.75 || 2321 || +17
|-
| 7 || align=left|      ||2381  ||0 ||0 ||½ ||0 ||1 ||0 ||* ||1 ||½ ||1 ||4  || || 2223 || -19
|-
| 8 || align=left| ||2339  ||½ ||½ ||½ ||0 ||½ ||½ ||0 ||* ||½ ||½ ||3½  || || 2187 || -19
|-
| 9 || align=left|  ||2227  ||0 ||½ ||0 ||0 ||0 ||½ ||½ ||½ ||* ||1 ||3  || || 2158 || -9
|-
| 10 || align=left|      ||2156  ||0 ||0 ||½ ||1 ||0 ||½ ||0 ||½ ||0 ||* ||2½  || || 2120 || -5
|}

{| class="wikitable" style="text-align: center;"
|+  HUN-ch (Women) 53rd Budapest 2003
!   !! Player !! Rating !! 1 !! 2 !! 3 !! 4 !! 5 !! 6 !! 7 !! 8 !! 9 !! 0 !! Points !! TB !! Perf. !! +/-
|-
| 1 || align=left|         || 2390 ||* ||0 ||1 ||1 ||1 ||1 ||1 ||1 ||½ ||1 ||7½ ||      || 2568 || +18
|-
| 2 || align=left|    ||2354  ||1 ||* ||½ ||½ ||½ ||½ ||1 ||1 ||1 ||1 ||7||      || 2510 || +18
|-
| 3 || align=left|            ||2403  ||0 ||½ ||* ||½ ||½ ||1 ||½ ||½ ||1||1 ||5½        || || 2367 || -4
|-       
| 4 || align=left|        ||2352  ||0 ||½ ||½ ||* ||½ ||½ ||½ ||1 ||1 ||½ ||5        || || 2332 || -2
|-
| 5 || align=left|       ||2372  ||0 ||½ ||½ ||½ ||* ||½ ||0 ||1 ||1 ||½ ||4½        ||16.75 || 2291 || -10
|-
| 6 || align=left|      ||2262  ||0 ||½ ||0 ||½ ||½ ||* ||1 ||½ ||½ ||1 ||4½         ||16.75 || 2303 || +5
|-
| 7 || align=left|||2249  ||0 ||0 ||½ ||½ ||1 ||0 ||* ||1 ||1 ||½ ||4½         ||15.50 || 2304 || +7
|-
| 8 || align=left|           ||2191  ||0 ||0 ||½ ||0 ||0 ||½||0 ||* ||1 ||1 ||3 ||      || 2191 || -1
|-
| 9 || align=left|                ||2196  ||½ ||0 ||0 ||0 ||0 ||½ ||0 ||0 ||* ||1 ||2        || || 2093 || -11
|- 
| 10 || align=left|    ||2222  ||0 ||0 ||0 ||½ ||½ ||0 ||½ ||0 ||0||* ||1½        ||  || 2029 || -20
|}

Average Elo: 2299 <=> Cat: 2

{| class="wikitable" style="text-align: center;"
|+ HUN-ch (Women) 57th Eger 2009
!   !! Player !! Rating !! 1 !! 2 !! 3 !! 4 !! 5 !! 6 !! 7 !! 8 !! 9 !! 0 !! Points !! TB !! Perf. !! +/- 
|-
| 1 || align=left|      ||2353  ||½ ||* ||0 ||1 ||½ ||1 ||1 ||1 ||1 ||1 ||7  ||26.50 || 2478 || +14
|-
| 2 || align=left|      ||2354  ||* ||½ ||1 ||1 ||½ ||½ ||1 ||½ ||1 ||1 ||7  ||28.00 || 2478 || +14
|-
| 3 || align=left|      ||2159  ||0 ||1 ||* ||0 ||1 ||½ ||1 ||1 ||½ ||½ ||5½ ||23.00 || 2361 || +25
|-
| 4 || align=left|    ||2344  ||½ ||1 ||1 ||* ||0 ||0 ||½ ||1 ||1 ||½ ||5½ ||19.50 || 2341 || 0
|-
| 5 || align=left| ||2310  ||½ ||½ ||0 ||1 ||* ||½ ||0 ||½ ||1 ||1 ||5  ||19.25 || 2305 || 0
|-
| 6 || align=left|  ||2375  ||0 ||0 ||½ ||½ ||½ ||* ||1 ||½ ||½ ||½ ||5  ||18.00 || 2298 || -9
|-
| 7 || align=left|     ||2313  ||0 ||0 ||½ ||0 ||1 ||0 ||* ||1 ||½ ||1 ||4  || || 2141 || -11
|-
| 8 || align=left|    ||2141  ||½ ||½ ||½ ||0 ||½ ||½ ||0 ||* ||½ ||½ ||3  || || 2121 || +2
|-
| 9 || align=left|    ||2236  ||0 ||½ ||0 ||0 ||0 ||½ ||½ ||½ ||* ||1 ||2  || || 2066 || -20
|-
| 10 || align=left|||2117  ||0 ||0 ||½ ||1 ||0 ||½ ||0 ||½ ||0 ||* ||1  || || 2074 || -15
|}

{| class="wikitable" style="text-align: center;"
|+ HUN-ch (Women) 58th 	Nyíregyháza 2010
!   !! Player !! Rating !! 1 !! 2 !! 3 !! 4 !! 5 !! 6 !! 7 !! 8 !! 9 !! 0 !! Points !! TB !! Perf. !! +/- 
|-
| 1 || align=left|          ||2344  ||* ||0 ||1 ||1 ||½ ||1 ||1 ||1 ||1 ||1 ||7½ || || 2497 || +15
|-
| 2 || align=left|            ||2175  ||1 ||* ||½ ||1 ||½ ||1 ||0 ||0 ||1 ||1 ||6 ||27.25 || 2357 || +23
|-
| 3 || align=left|        ||2234  ||0 ||½ ||* ||½ ||1 ||1 ||1 ||½ ||1 ||½ ||6 ||23.00 || 2350 || +15
|-
| 4 || align=left|      ||2389  ||½ ||1 ||1 ||* ||0 ||0 ||½ ||1 ||1 ||½ ||5½|| || 2302 || +2
|-
| 5 || align=left|           ||2270  ||½ ||½ ||0 ||1 ||* ||½ ||0 ||½ ||1 ||1 ||4½|| || 2227 || -5
|-
| 6 || align=left|        ||2146  ||0 ||0 ||½ ||½ ||½ ||* ||1 ||½ ||½ ||½ ||4 || || 2201 || +6
|-
| 7 || align=left|   ||2339  ||0 ||0 ||½ ||0 ||1 ||0 ||* ||1 ||½ ||1 ||3½ || || 2141 || -25
|-
| 8 || align=left|||2139  ||½ ||½ ||½ ||0 ||½ ||½ ||0 ||* ||½ ||½ ||3|| || 2121 || -3
|-
| 9 || align=left|          ||2223  ||0 ||½ ||0 ||0 ||0 ||½ ||½ ||½ ||* ||1 ||2½||10.00 || 2066 || -19
|-
| 10 || align=left|      ||2147  ||0 ||0 ||½ ||1 ||0 ||½ ||0 ||½ ||0 ||* ||2½||8.50 || 2074 || -9
|}

{| class="wikitable" style="text-align: center;"
|+ HUN-ch (Women) 59th Szeged 2011
!   !! Player !! Rating !! 1 !! 2 !! 3 !! 4 !! 5 !! 6 !! 7 !! 8 !! 9 !! 0 !! Points !! TB !! Perf. !! +/- 
|-
| 1 || align=left|         ||2359  ||* ||½ ||½ ||½ ||½ ||1 ||1 ||½ ||½ ||1 ||6 ||5.00 || 2370 || +2
|-
| 2 || align=left|        ||2204  ||½ ||* ||1 ||0 ||½ ||1 ||0 ||1 ||1 ||1 ||6 ||4.00 || 2388 || +23
|-
| 3 || align=left| ||2375  ||½ ||0 ||* ||0 ||1 ||½ ||1 ||1 ||1 ||1 ||6 ||3.00 || 2370 || 0
|-
| 4 || align=left|         ||2340  ||½ ||1 ||1 ||* ||0 ||0 ||½ ||1 ||1 ||½ ||5½ ||23.25 || 2332 || -1
|-
| 5 || align=left|      ||2204  ||½ ||½ ||0 ||1 ||* ||½ ||0 ||½ ||1 ||1 ||5½ ||21.75 || 2346 || +18
|-
| 6 || align=left|         ||2256  ||0 ||0 ||½ ||½ ||½ ||* ||1 ||½ ||½ ||½ ||5 || || 2300 || +6
|-
| 7 || align=left|       ||2212  ||0 ||0 ||½ ||0 ||1 ||0 ||* ||1 ||½ ||1 ||4 || || 2228 || +2
|-
| 8 || align=left|      ||2139  ||½ ||½ ||½ ||0 ||½ ||½ ||0 ||* ||½ ||½ ||3½ || || 2196 || +6
|-
| 9 || align=left|      ||2215  ||0 ||½ ||0 ||0 ||0 ||½ ||½ ||½ ||* ||1 ||2|| || 2049 || -19
|-
| 10 || align=left|         ||2216  ||0 ||0 ||½ ||1 ||0 ||½ ||0 ||½ ||0 ||* ||1½ || || 1987 || -24
|}

{| class="wikitable" style="text-align: center;"
|+ HUN-ch (Women) 60th Kisvarda 2012
!   !! Player !! Rating !! 1 !! 2 !! 3 !! 4 !! 5 !! 6 !! 7 !! 8 !! 9 !! 0 !! Points !! TB !! Perf. !! +/- 
|-
| 1 || align=left|         ||2254  ||* ||½ ||½ ||1 ||1 ||0 ||½ ||1 ||1 ||1 ||6½ || || 2398 || +17
|-
| 2 || align=left|         ||2377  ||½ ||* ||½ ||½ ||1 ||1 ||0 ||1 ||½ ||1 ||6 ||24.75 || 2340 || -3
|-
| 3 || align=left|       ||2243  ||½ ||½ ||* ||0 ||1 ||1 ||1 ||½ ||½ ||1 ||6 ||24.50 || 2354 || +14
|-
| 4 || align=left|        ||2322  ||0 ||½ ||1 ||* ||½ ||1 ||0 ||½ ||½ ||1 ||5 ||20.75 || 2264 || -7
|-
| 5 || align=left|||2306  ||0 ||0 ||0 ||½ ||* ||1 ||1 ||½ ||1 ||1 ||5 ||17.25 || 2266 || -5
|-
| 6 || align=left|     ||2185  ||1 ||0 ||0 ||0 ||0 ||* ||1 ||1 ||½ ||1 ||4½ || || 2240 || +7
|-
| 7 || align=left|        ||2210  ||½ ||1 ||0 ||1 ||0 ||0 ||* ||½ ||½ ||½ ||4 || || 2199 || -2
|-
| 8 || align=left|     ||2085  ||0 ||0 ||½ ||½ ||½ ||0 ||½ ||* ||1 ||½ ||3½ || || 2173 || +9
|-
| 9 || align=left|      ||2234  ||0 ||½ ||½ ||½ ||0 ||½ ||½ ||0 ||* ||½ ||3 || || 2115 || -15
|-
| 10 || align=left|       ||2133  ||0 ||0 ||0 ||0 ||0 ||0 ||½ ||½ ||½ ||* ||1½ || || 1967 || -16
|}

References

Fehér, Gyula (1991–2005), Magyar Országos SakkTájékoztató, results 1991–2005
 (men's winners up to 1985)

Short bio of Attila Schneider
Women's 2007 event Zsuzsa Verőci report
ChessBase online database 

Chess national championships
Women's chess national championships
Championship
Recurring sporting events established in 1906
Chess
1906 establishments in Austria-Hungary